The Uptown Dubai Tower 1 or Burj 2020 is a proposed  mega-tall skyscraper to be built in Jumeirah Lake Towers, Dubai, United Arab Emirates.

History

First announced by developer Dubai Multi Commodities Centre at Cityscape Global in September 2015, it has been designed by Adrian Smith + Gordon Gill Architecture. When Dubai won the bid to host the Expo 2020 in 2013, in honour of the win, the Uptown Dubai Tower 1 was nicknamed Burj 2020 (Tower 2020). Responding to media questions about the status of the project in May 2017, the developer insisted the project will go ahead, saying "Significant steps were taken in 2016 to finalise Burj 2020 District master development plans, to include two iconic super-tall towers designed by leading architects Adrian Smith & Gordon Gill."

References

Skyscrapers in Dubai